The Jardin botanique du Thabor, also known as the Jardin botanique de la Ville de Rennes, is a compact but significant botanical garden located at the eastern side of the Parc du Thabor, Place Saint-Mélaine, Rennes, Ille-et-Vilaine, in the region of Brittany, France. It is open daily without charge.

The garden was established in 1868 and consists of circular walkways around 11 beds growing over 3,000 species. The larger park contains 129 species of trees, including 34 conifer species, as well as 373 shrub species. Its holdings also include about 1500 herbarium specimens. Between 2008 and 2018, the park was renovated. This was complicated by the presence of buxus parasites.

See also 
 List of botanical gardens in France

References

 Jardin botanique du Thabor
 Map of Thabor
 BGCI entry
 Convention on Biological Diversity - Botanical gardens in France
 Gralon.net entry (French)

Gardens in Ille-et-Vilaine
Botanical gardens in France